The centre-right coalition is an alliance of political parties in Italy, active—under several forms and names—since 1994, when Silvio Berlusconi entered politics and formed his Forza Italia party. Despite its name, the alliance mostly falls on the right-wing of the political spectrum. 

In the 1994 general election, under the leadership of Berlusconi, the centre-right ran with two coalitions, the Pole of Freedoms in northern Italy and Tuscany (mainly Forza Italia and the Northern League) and the Pole of Good Government (mainly Forza Italia and National Alliance) in central and southern Italy. In the 1996 general election, after the Northern League had left in late 1994, the centre-right coalition took the name of Pole for Freedoms. The Northern League returned in 2000, and the coalition was re-formed as the House of Freedoms; this lasted until 2008.

Since 2008, when Forza Italia and National Alliance merged into The People of Freedom, the coalition has not had official names. The new Forza Italia was formed in late 2013; for the 2018 general election it joined forces with the Northern League and Brothers of Italy and a collection of mainly centrist forces named Us with Italy–Union of the Centre.

In 2018, the Northern League formed a coalition government with the Five Star Movement and without its centre-right allies, which entered the opposition. This led to a deterioration of the centre-right coalition at a national level, although the coalition is still active at the level of local elections.

During the 2022 general election, the center-right coalition obtained a decisive victory by securing the absolute majority of seats in both chambers. Brothers of Italy emerged as the first party by surpassing the League and gained six million votes in four years. This is the first time the center-right won a general election since 2008.

History

Pole of Freedoms and Pole of Good Government

 
In 1994, the media magnate Silvio Berlusconi, previously very close to the Socialist Prime Minister Bettino Craxi and even having appeared in commercials for the Italian Socialist Party, was studying the possibility of making a political party of his own to avoid what seemed to be the unavoidable victory of the left wing at the next elections. Only three months before the election, he presented his new party, Forza Italia, in a televised announcement on 26 January 1994. Supporters believed that he wanted to avert a communist victory, while opponents believed that he was defending the ancién regime by rebranding it. Regardless of his motives, he employed his power in communication (he owned, and still owns, all of the three main private TV stations in Italy) and advanced communication techniques he and his allies knew very well, as his fortune was largely based on advertisement.

Berlusconi managed to ally himself with both the National Alliance and the Northern League in February 1994, without these being allied with each other. Forza Italia teamed up with the League in the North, where they competed against the National Alliance, and with  the National Alliance in the rest of Italy, where the League was not present. This unusual coalition configuration was caused by the deep hate between the League, which wanted to separate Italy and held Rome in deep contempt, and the nationalist post-fascists; on one occasion, Bossi encouraged his supporters to go find National-Alliance supporters "house by house," suggesting a lynching (which, however, did not actually take place).

In the 1994 general election, Berlusconi's coalition won a decisive victory over Occhetto's one, becoming the first center-right coalition to win the general election since the Second World War. In the popular vote, Berlusconi's coalition outpolled the Alliance of Progressives by over 5.1 million votes. Pole of Freedoms won in the main regions of Italy.

Pole for Freedoms

Pole for Freedoms was formed as a continuation of the Pole of Freedoms and Pole of Good Government coalitions, which had both supported the leadership of Silvio Berlusconi at the 1994 general election: the Pole of Freedom was constituted by Forza Italia and Northern League, the Pole of Good Government by Forza Italia and the National Alliance. After that, Lega Nord left the coalition at the end of 1994, the centre-right was forced to reform itself: in 1995, on the occasion of the regional elections, an organic alliance was formed. In 1996 it was officially named "Pole for Freedoms" and debuted in the 1996 general election; however, it was defeated by the centre-left alliance The Olive Tree, whose leader was Romano Prodi.

House of Freedoms

The House of Freedoms was the successor of the Pole of Freedoms/Pole of Good Government and the Pole for Freedoms.

In the run-up of the 2001 general election, after a six-year spell in opposition, which Berlusconi called "the crossing of the desert", he managed to re-unite the coalition under the "House of Freedoms" banner. According to its leader, the alliance was a "broad democratic arch, composed of the democratic right, namely AN, the great democratic centre, namely Forza Italia, CCD and CDU, and the democratic left represented by the League, the New PSI, and the Italian Republican Party.

The CdL won the 2001 general election by a landslide and, consequently, the Berlusconi II Cabinet was formed. In government, FI, whose strongholds included Lombardy as well as Sicily, and the LN, which was active only in the Centre-North, formed the so-called "axis of the North", through the special relationship between three Lombards leaders, Berlusconi, Giulio Tremonti and Umberto Bossi; on the other side of the coalition, AN and the Union of Christian and Centre Democrats (UDC), the party emerged from the merger of the CCD and the CDU in late 2002, became the natural representatives of Southern interests.

In 2003 the CdL was routed in local elections by The Olive Tree and the LN threatened to pull out. Also, the 2004 European Parliament election were disappointing for FI and the coalition as a whole, even though AN, the UDC, and the LN did better than the previous election. As a result, the Berlusconi and FI were weaker within the CdL.

In 2005 the coalition lost heavily in regional elections, losing six of the eight regions it controlled. The defeat was particularly damaging in the South, while the only two regions that the coalition managed to keep, Lombardy and Veneto, were in the North, where the LN was decisive. This led to a government crisis, particularly after the UDC pulled its ministers out. A few days later, the Berlusconi III Cabinet was formed with minor changes from the previous cabinet.

In the 2006 general election the CdL, which had opened its ranks to a number of minor parties, lost to The Olive Tree.

The People of Freedom

The People of Freedom, launched by Silvio Berlusconi on 18 November 2007, was initially a federation of political parties, notably including Forza Italia and National Alliance, which participated as a joint election list in the 2008 general election. The federation was later transformed into a party during a party congress on 27–29 March 2009. The UDC, now UdC, left the centre-right coalition and made an alliance with The Rose for Italy, the Populars and other centrist parties. UdC later joined the New Pole for Italy in 2010 and With Monti for Italy in 2012.

The PdL formed Italy's government from 2008 to 2011 in coalition with the Northern League. In 2010 the Future and Freedom (FLI) movement, led by the former MSI/AN leader Gianfranco Fini, split from PdL. FLI joined UdC and other parties to form the New Pole for Italy, but they kept supporting the government.

After Berlusconi's resignation during the European debt crisis, the PdL supported Mario Monti's technocratic government in 2011–2012, and after the 2013 general election, it became part of Enrico Letta's government of grand coalition with the Democratic Party, Civic Choice and the Union of the Centre. Angelino Alfano, then party's secretary, functioned as Deputy Prime Minister and Minister of the Interior.

Centre-right coalitions since 2013

In June 2013 Berlusconi announced Forza Italia's revival and the PdL's transformation into a centre-right coalition. On 16 November 2013 the PdL's national council voted to dissolve the party and start a new Forza Italia; the assembly was deserted by a group of dissidents, led by Alfano, who had launched the alternative New Centre-Right party the day before.

After the 2016 constitutional referendum, UdC left the centre-left coalition and approached the centre-right coalition again. In 2017 Civic Choice also joined the centre-right coalition. UdC and Civic Choice ran with the centre-right coalition in the 2017 Sicilian regional election.

Following the 2018 general election, the centre-right coalition, led by Matteo Salvini's League, emerged with a plurality of seats in the Chamber of Deputies and in the Senate, while the anti-establishment Five Star Movement (M5S) led by Luigi Di Maio became the party with the largest number of votes. The centre-left coalition, led by former Prime Minister Matteo Renzi, came third. However, no political group or party won an outright majority, resulting in a hung parliament.

After three months of negotiation, a coalition was finally formed on 1 June between the M5S and the League, whose leaders both became Deputy Prime Ministers in a government led by the M5S-linked independent Giuseppe Conte as Prime Minister. This coalition lasted until September 2019.

Following the 2021 Italian government crisis, the previous government was replaced by a national unity government in February 2021, including League and Forza Italia along with M5S, the Democratic Party, Article One and Italia Viva.

Composition

1994 general election 
In the 1994 general election, the centre-right coalition ran under the name of Pole of Freedoms in northern Italy, including the Northern League and leaving out National Alliance, which instead ran alone. In central Italy and southern Italy, where the Northern League wasn't present, the coalition ran instead under the name of Pole of Good Government, including also National Alliance.

The Pole of Freedoms was composed of four parties:

The Pole of Good Government was instead composed of six parties:

1996 general election 
In the 1996 general election, the Pole for Freedoms was composed of the following parties:

The coalition made an agreement of desistance with the Pannella–Sgarbi List in some constituencies.

2001 general election 
In the 2001 general election, the House of Freedoms was composed of seven parties:

The coalition presented a candidate a member of the Sardinian Reformers in Sardinia. It also made an agreement of desistance with the Tricolour Flame in one constituency in Sicily.

2006 general election 
In the 2006 general election, the House of Freedoms was composed of the following parties:

The House of Freedoms was also supported by Unitalia, by Italy Again and by the National Democratic Party.

2008 general election 

Berlusconi launched The People of Freedom in late 2007; this was joined by FI, AN and minor parties, and continued its alliance with the LN.
In the 2008 general election, the coalition was composed of three parties:

2013 general election 
In the 2013 general election, the coalition was composed of the following parties:

2018 general election 
In the 2018 general election, the coalition was composed of five parties:

2022 general election 
For the 2022 general election the coalition is composed of four parties:

The coalition was also supported by Social Democratic Rebirth.

Popular support

Electoral results

Italian Parliament

Regional Councils

See also
 Centre-left coalition (Italy)
 Pole of Freedoms
 Pole of Good Government
 Pole for Freedoms
 House of Freedoms

References

Political party alliances in Italy